Coleophora flaviella is a moth of the family Coleophoridae. It is found from Germany to the Iberian Peninsula, Sicily and Greece and from France to Romania.

The larvae feed on Coronilla coronata and Coronilla minima.

References

flaviella
Moths described in 1857
Moths of Europe